Kamijō Station is the name of two train stations in Japan:

 Kamijō Station (Nagano)
 Kamijō Station (Niigata)